Scopula nepheloperas is a moth of the  family Geometridae. It is found in Kenya, Niger and Sudan.

References

Moths described in 1916
nepheloperas
Moths of Africa